Uladzislau Alehavich Hancharou (born 2 December 1995) is a Belarusian male trampoline gymnast. He is the 2016 Olympic champion in men's individual trampoline.

Career 
Hancharou started training trampoline at the age of six. He made his senior debut in 2012 and won a gold medal at the World Cup Trampoline in Sofia. Hancharou competed in his first Worlds at the 2013 World Championships in Sofia, Bulgaria.

In 2014, Hancharou began reaching the podium at numerous World Cup events. He won the individual gold at the 2014 European Championships and bronze in the team event. At the 2014 World Championships in Daytona Beach, United States, he won bronze in individual and silver in synchro.

In 2015, Hancharou won silver medals in individual and synchro at the inaugural European Games, held in Baku, Azerbaijan. He repeated his success at the 2015 World Championships, winning silver medals in men's individual, synchro and bronze in team. In August 2016, he won the Olympic gold medal in men's individual trampoline at the Summer Olympics in Rio. This was the only gold medal won for Belarus at the games.

References

External links 

 
 
 Uladzislau Hancharou at The-Sports.org
 

1995 births
Living people
Belarusian male trampolinists
Sportspeople from Vitebsk
European Games medalists in gymnastics
Gymnasts at the 2015 European Games
Gymnasts at the 2019 European Games
European Games gold medalists for Belarus
European Games silver medalists for Belarus
Olympic gymnasts of Belarus
Gymnasts at the 2016 Summer Olympics
Olympic gold medalists for Belarus
Olympic medalists in gymnastics
Medalists at the 2016 Summer Olympics
Medalists at the Trampoline Gymnastics World Championships
Gymnasts at the 2020 Summer Olympics
21st-century Belarusian people